In the mathematical classification of finite simple groups, the component theorem of  shows that if G is a simple group of odd type, and various other assumptions are satisfied, then G has a centralizer of an involution with a  "standard component" with small centralizer.

References

Theorems about finite groups